Asisten Rumah Tangga is an Indonesian soap opera produced by SinemArt. It first aired on RCTI on March 27, 2016.

Synopsis 

The plot of this series revolves around the main character, Anna, played by Celine Evangelista. She leaves her poor hometown to seek a fortune in the capital city of Jakarta. While attending university in Jakarta, Anna struggles financially, which leads her to work as a maid for a businessman named Rio, played by Dirly.

Rio is kind and supportive of Anna and helps pay for her food and clothes. Although the two fall in love, they remain silent about their feelings in order to maintain their professional boundaries as employee and employer.

Rio's friend, Daniel, played by Mischa Chandrawinata, visits Rio often. When Daniel sees Anna, he falls in love with her as well. Other maids in the residential complex begin to meddle, and the love triangle soon becomes even more complicated.

Cast

Main cast 
 Celine Evangelista as Anna (19), a beautiful and hard-working young girl. She goes to school and works in Jakarta so she can help her family in her hometown. She works as a maid in Rio's house.
 Dirly as Rio (26), a young and single businessman who is too busy to take care of his own house and hires Anna as his housekeeper.
 Mischa Chandrawinata as Daniel (26), a single and kind yet goofy man who is Rio's best friend.
 Ana Pinem 
 Marcella Simon
 Natalie Sarah

Supporting cast 
 Sasha Alexa
 Fatmasury
 Attalarik Syah            
 Eeng Saptahadi
 Fanny Fadillah
 Ria Probo
 Purwaniatun             
 Yoelitta Palar
 Suheil Fahmi
 Cantik Salshabila
 Aura Kasih

References

External links 
 
Wirausaha Ibu Rumah Tangga

Indonesian television soap operas
2016 Indonesian television series debuts
2016 Indonesian television series endings
RCTI original programming